An apple is an edible fruit.

Apple, Apples or APPLE may also refer to: 

 Apple Inc., an American multinational technology company
 Apple (name), a list of people and fictional characters named Apple
 Apple (symbolism), the fruit as a mythic or religious symbol

Arts, entertainment and media

Film and television 
 The Apple (1980 film), a sci-fi musical comedy
 The Apple (1998 film), an Iranian true-life drama
 "The Apple" (Star Trek: The Original Series), a 1967 sci-fi TV episode
 Apples (film), a 2020 Greek  drama
 "Apple", an episode of The Good Doctor

Music groups 
 Apple (band), a British psychedelic rock group
 The Apples (Israeli band), a 2000s funk, jazz and groove group
 The Apples (Scottish band), an early 1990s, indie-dance group
 The Apples in Stereo, originally The Apples, an American rock group

Musical works 
 Apple (A. G. Cook album), 2020
 Apple (Mother Love Bone album), 1990
 Apples (album), by Ian Dury, 1989
 "Apple", a song on Julia Michaels' Inner Monologue Part 1 album, 2019
 "Apple", a song on GFriend's Song of the Sirens album, 2020
 "Apples", a song on No Shame (Lily Allen album), 2018

Publications 
 Apples (novel), by Richard Milward, 2007
 Apple Daily, a Hong-Kong-based newspaper
 Apple Daily (Taiwan), a newspaper

Other media 
 Apple (artwork), by Yoko Ono, 1966
 Apples (card game), a Whist-like trick-taking game
 Apple FM, an Australian community radio station

Businesses and organisations

Political parties 
 Party of Free Democrats (formerly and informally Yabluko), Ukraine
 Yabloko, Russia

Publishers 
 Apple Comics, or Apple Press, an American comic book publisher, 1986–1994
 Apple Corps, a British multimedia company founded by The Beatles
 Apple Records, a record label

Tech businesses and organisations 
 Apple Inc., an American multinational
 Apple Store, their chain of retail stores
 Apple Pugetsound Program Library Exchange (A.P.P.L.E.), an Apple computer users' group

Other businesses 
 Apple Bank for Savings, an American bank
 Apple Leisure Group, an American travel and hospitality conglomerate

Events 
 Apple Cup, an American college football rivalry
 Apple Fire, a 2020 wildfire in Riverside County, California

Places 
 Apples, Vaud, Switzerland
 Apple, Oklahoma, United States
 Apple Creek (disambiguation)
 Apple Island (disambiguation)
 Apple River (disambiguation)

Technology 

 Apple (automobile), an American car by Apple Automobile Company 1917–1918
 Apple I, originally Apple Computer, 1976
 Apple II series, 1977
 Apple II, 1977
 Apple III, 1980
 Ariane Passenger Payload Experiment (APPLE), a 1981 Indian communication satellite
 HP Apple, a microprocessor

See also 

 Apel (disambiguation)
 Appel (disambiguation)
 Apple Store (disambiguation)
 Apple TV (disambiguation)
 Big Apple (disambiguation)
 Candy Apples (born 1976), American pornographic actress
 Crabapple (disambiguation)
 Thornapple (disambiguation)
 Cashew apple, the fruit that grows with the cashew nut
 Custard apple, several fruits 
 Hedge apple, Maclura pomifera
 Love apple, two species 
 Mammee apple, two species 
 May apple, Podophyllum peltatum
 Oak apple, a gall that grows on oak trees
 Rose apple, several species 
 Wax apple, Syzygium samarangense